The Seaforth Generals are a United Hockey Union-sanctioned junior ice hockey team from Seaforth, Ontario, Canada.  They are a member of the Canadian Premier Junior Hockey League and began play in the 2016–17 season.

History
Prior to settling on Seaforth, Generals' owner 28-year-old T.J. Runhart, also considered Monkton Ontario. There was also the possibility of placing the team in the Greater Metro Junior A Hockey League (GMHL) but operating costs were too high. On April 15, 2016, the Generals became the fourth franchise to join the Canadian Premier Junior Hockey League (CPJHL).

Season-by-season records

References

External links
Generals website

Ice hockey teams in Ontario